Ammoplanops is a genus of aphid wasps in the family Crabronidae. There are about 15 described species in Ammoplanops.

Species
These 15 species belong to the genus Ammoplanops:

 Ammoplanops ashmeadi Pate, 1939
 Ammoplanops californicus R. Bohart & Smith, 1978
 Ammoplanops carinatus Gussakovskij, 1931
 Ammoplanops cockerelli (Ashmead, 1903)
 Ammoplanops cressoni Pate, 1939
 Ammoplanops irwini R. Bohart & Smith, 1978
 Ammoplanops milleri R. Bohart & Smith, 1978
 Ammoplanops moenkopi Pate, 1939
 Ammoplanops mongolicus Tsuneki, 1972
 Ammoplanops neomexicanus R. Bohart & Smith, 1978
 Ammoplanops powelli R. Bohart & Smith, 1978
 Ammoplanops timberlakei Pate, 1939
 Ammoplanops tuberculifer Gussakovskij, 1931
 Ammoplanops utahensis R. Bohart & Smith, 1978
 Ammoplanops vierecki Pate, 1939

References

Crabronidae
Articles created by Qbugbot